The Gaylord National Resort & Convention Center is a hotel and convention center located at National Harbor, Prince George's County, in the U.S. state of Maryland. The hotel is situated along the shores of the Potomac, downriver from Washington, D.C., and across the river from Alexandria, Virginia. It is owned by Gaylord Hotels, a division of Ryman Hospitality Properties (formerly known as Gaylord Entertainment Company), and operated by Marriott International. The hotel opened April 1, 2008, as part of a new mixed-use (office, residential, and retail) development in National Harbor. It is one of the largest non-gaming hotel and convention centers on the East Coast of the United States. It cost $870 million to build.

The center was originally named the "Gaylord Potomac Resort & Convention Center"; the name was changed in the planning stage. The hotel contains 2,000 guest rooms, 95 event rooms,  of meeting space, seven restaurants, and a  spa. It employs 2,000 people. It features a 19-story glass atrium with views of the Potomac River.

It had over 1.3 million room nights booked before its formal opening on April 1, 2008. Other adjacent hotels and facilities were under construction at the time.

The convention center hosted the 2011 Republican National Committee Winter Meeting, at which the 2011 Republican National Committee chairmanship election took place.  It also hosts Katsucon, a celebration of anime. The Gaylord has also hosted MAGFest, a yearly festival celebrating video games, their music, and culture, since 2012.<ref>MAGFest X Roundup, Part One </r A Fond Look Back at MAGFest 11</ref> The annual Scripps National Spelling Bee has been held at the Gaylord since 2011. In 2014, the Gaylord hosted the 36th annual Technology Student Association National Conference. In 2016, the hotel also hosted the MLB Winter Meetings. In 2019, the hotel hosted the 41st annual Technology Student Association National Conference.

Some departments within the property are represented by different trade unions, the largest being Local 25 of the Unite Here! trade organization.

Image gallery

References

External links 

 Gaylord National Resort & Convention Center
 National Harbor, Maryland
 

Hotel buildings completed in 2008
Hotels in Maryland
Gaylord Hotels
Potomac River
Buildings and structures in Prince George's County, Maryland
Tourist attractions in Prince George's County, Maryland
Convention centers in Maryland
Oxon Hill, Maryland